En la cuerda del hambre ("On the Rope of Hunger") is a 1978 Mexican film. It was directed by Gustavo Alatriste.

External links
 

1978 films
Mexican drama films
1970s Spanish-language films
Films directed by Gustavo Alatriste
1970s Mexican films